Épaux-Bézu is a commune in the Aisne department in Hauts-de-France in northern France.

Population

Geography 
Épaux-Bézu is located about ten kilometers north of Château-Thierry, near the A4 motorway and the D1.

See also
Communes of the Aisne department

References

Communes of Aisne
Aisne communes articles needing translation from French Wikipedia